Pride and Glory is a 2008 American crime drama film directed by Gavin O'Connor, and starring Edward Norton, Colin Farrell, Jon Voight and Noah Emmerich. It was released on October 24, 2008 in the United States.

Plot
Assistant Chief Francis Tierney Sr. heads a multigenerational New York City Police Department (NYPD) family, which includes his wife Maureen, their son Francis "Franny" Jr., his wife Abby, their three children Caitlin, Francis III and Bailey; their son Ray and their daughter Megan; her husband Jimmy Egan and their two children Shannon and Matthew. Deputy Inspector Franny is the Commanding Officer of the 31st Precinct, where Sergeant Jimmy is a patrol officer, while Detective Ray works in the Missing Persons Squad, having transferred to this lighter duty after being shot during an arrest two years earlier.

Jimmy leads the NYPD to victory in city-league football. While everybody is celebrating, Franny receives a call that four men from his precinct have been shot dead when answering a "shots fired" 911 call at the Washington Heights apartment of a local drug gang leader, Angel Tezo. Francis Sr. coaxes Ray into joining a task force put together to investigate the killings.

Jimmy and fellow patrol officers Kenny Dugan, Reuben "Sandy" Santiago and Eddie Carbone find the abandoned cab Tezo fled in, containing the dead cab driver. The four officers are part of a corrupt group in Franny's precinct, along with the four dead officers. Under Jimmy's direction, they burn the cab and dead driver, and set about finding Tezo before Ray and the task force do.

Ray tells Franny that his investigation has revealed that a policeman named Sandy had tipped off Tezo to the raid. When Franny later confronts Santiago, he admits to what he did and expresses surprise that Franny never knew what was going on with the officers in his precinct. He says, "Everyone knew." The cops had intended to kill Tezo so they could work with another dealer, Eladio Casado, but Santiago warned Tezo due to a childhood friendship, believing Tezo would simply flee. Though Franny tells Santiago to hand over his badge, he does not take the information to his superiors, fearful of losing his command. Later, Casado arrives at Jimmy's house, pressuring Jimmy for failing to find and kill Tezo.

Steady police work helps Ray find Tezo, while elsewhere Jimmy beats Tezo's cousin and prepares to kill the cousin's baby to get the same information. Ray reaches Tezo only to find Jimmy and his crew there first, torturing Tezo to death. Ray tries to intervene; however, Jimmy suddenly uses Ray's gun to kill Tezo, then tells Ray to accept being the hero who killed the cop-killer. Jimmy's crew leaves just before Ray's backup arrives.

Overcome with grief over his role in the murders and the corruption, Santiago meets privately with a reporter and confesses to the corruption (without giving names) in the 31st Precinct, then commits suicide in the reporter's car.  After the newspaper reports the corruption, Internal Affairs (IAB) investigates the Tezo killing. Ray says he was not the shooter and refuses to say more, while Jimmy admits his crew was there then fabricates a story that Ray killed Tezo in cold blood. Jimmy later is chastised by Franny, where it is revealed that Franny gave Jimmy and his crew space to conduct their own investigations to bring the crime rate down. But Jimmy and his crew took advantage of that and started acting by their own rules, eventually becoming corrupt. Jimmy offers Franny money from Jimmy's dealings, but Franny refuses and warns him he won't allow him to frame Ray. Francis Sr. is furious with his son for not lying to IAB, but Ray reveals that he did enough lying for his father regarding the shooting that hurt him two years earlier, at which his fellow officers vengefully threw the shooter off a building in revenge. Ray's false testimony cost him his marriage as his ex-wife Tasha knew he had lied and told him he was wrong to do it. Francis Sr. begs Ray to admit to the accusations, promising that he'll ensure that he receives only a slap on the wrist. Franny arrives and tells his father that the lies and corruption end now, and they will arrest their brother-in-law even if it costs Franny his career.

Matters quickly unravel within the 31st Precinct sector. Franny and Ray look for Jimmy, while Dugan and Carbone hold up a liquor store, with Carbone and a customer soon dead and Dugan holding the owner hostage. While Tezo's cousin agitates the crowd outside the liquor store, Franny goes in and arrests Dugan. Ray confronts Jimmy at a nearby bar, where Ray wins a brutal brawl between them. Ray is walking a handcuffed Jimmy back to the liquor store when the still-agitated crowd surrounds them. Tezo's cousin has the crowd hold Ray while Jimmy offers himself to be beaten to death. Ray staggers away from his dead brother-in-law, returning to Franny at the liquor store. A few days later, the three Tierney men arrive at the New York County Courthouse to give their statements.

Cast

Production
Gavin O'Connor and his twin brother Greg began writing the film with New York City police officer Robert A. Hopes in 1999, after the completion of Tumbleweeds. The brothers, whose father was a police officer, were given "rare" access to the police department and its officers. Gavin O'Connor described their intent: "My father was a New York City detective, and I grew up in that world. It's a birthday bash of honest cops, which was everything my father was about. Though it is fictional, it is an homage to my father." They also hoped to create a film which evoked those of the 1970s, using corruption in the police force, as a metaphor for wider institutional corruption. The script was optioned in June 2000 by Fine Line Features, a subdivision of New Line Cinema, and Joe Carnahan was hired to rewrite the script. Production on the film was expected to begin later in 2000, with Gavin O'Connor directing and Greg O'Connor producing.

In 2001, the project was subject to a turnaround deal, which saw the rights ceded to Intermedia. Production was expected to start in February 2002 in New York City, and Mark Wahlberg and Hugh Jackman were in talks to star. The film's development was subject to further delays until 2005. Carnahan cited the September 11, 2001 attacks as the primary reason for the delay: "There was a moment after 9/11, where the notion of doing what might be deemed an anti-cop film, particularly an attack of the NYPD, would be grounds for hanging."

In September 2005, the rights were once more with New Line Cinema. Production president Toby Emmerich (brother of actor Noah, who had previously starred in O'Connor's Tumbleweeds and Miracle) had been a fan of the script for several years, and the studio entered negotiations with Norton, Farrell and Noah Emmerich to star. Production was set to begin in New York City in January 2006, though principal photography did not begin until the following month.  Nick Nolte was on set at the start of filming to play Francis Tierney Sr., but after a chronic knee injury flared up, he was unable to perform and was replaced by Voight.  Nolte later revealed in his memoir that he quit the film because he couldn’t stand Norton’s “cocky” attitude.

Cinematographer Declan Quinn said that the biggest challenge was "[trying] to find a fresh way to do a police drama where it feels real and not like something we've seen a hundred times before."

Release
The film was originally scheduled for release on March 14, 2008, and trailers for the film appeared, with showings of No Country for Old Men, Atonement, and American Gangster. In January 2008, New Line announced that it was pushing back the release until 2009, citing both Norton and Farrell's 2008 releases of The Incredible Hulk, and In Bruges respectively. The studio had not commented further on the delay, which angered O'Connor. He blamed internal New Line politics for the delay, specifically chairman Bob Shaye, saying, "I don't think [Shaye] believes in it, and he's decided he'll only release [sure bet] films. He never had the decency to call me." O'Connor had said he would withhold delivery of his next script for New Line, Warrior, until he discovered the film's fate, and also looked at the possibility of taking the film to another studio. In February 2008, O'Connor held a screening at the headquarters of talent agency CAA, in order to publicize that the film may need a new distributor.

O'Connor said of the situation, "We've delivered something special and unique, a film that's not for everybody but has something to say. We're all heartbroken." Norton blamed a wider industry "paralysis" for the problems, rather than New Line Cinema: "We're a victim of the moment, and I just hope they will either find a way to give the film its due or graciously let us do it with someone else." Farrell said he believed in the film and called the situation "bizarre".

Reception

Critical reaction
The film premiered on October 24, 2008 in the United States. Rotten Tomatoes reported that 35% of critics gave the film positive reviews, based on 140 reviews, with the critical consensus being that "Formulaic in its plotting and clichéd in its dialogue, Pride and Glory does little to distinguish itself from other police procedurals."  The film was also accused of racism for its portrayal of Dominican Americans.

Box office
As of January 28, 2009, the film has grossed $43,440,721 worldwide. In North America, the film opened at #5 with $6,262,396 behind High School Musical 3: Senior Year, Saw V, Max Payne, and Beverly Hills Chihuahua, respectively, from 2,585 theaters with a $2,423 average.

Soundtrack

The film's original score was composed by Mark Isham.

References

External links

2008 films
2008 crime drama films
2000s American films
2000s English-language films
2000s police procedural films
American crime drama films
American police detective films
English-language German films
Films about corruption in the United States
Films about the illegal drug trade
Films about the New York City Police Department
Films about police corruption
Films directed by Gavin O'Connor
Films scored by Mark Isham
Films set in New York City
Films shot in New York City
Films with screenplays by Joe Carnahan
German crime drama films
New Line Cinema films
Warner Bros. films
2000s German films